Hamdan bin Sheikh Tahir (27 April 1921 – 20 January 2005) was the 6th Governor of Penang, Malaysia from 1989 to 2001.

Honours

Honours of Malaysia
  : 
 Officer of the Order of the Defender of the Realm (K.M.N.) (1965)
 Commander of the Order of Loyalty to the Crown of Malaysia (P.S.M.) - Tan Sri (1974)
 Grand Commander of the Order of the Defender of the Realm (S.M.N.) - Tun (1989)

  Knight Grand Commander of the Order of the Defender of State (D.U.P.N.) - Dato' Seri Utama

References

Malaysian people of Malay descent
1921 births
2005 deaths
United Malays National Organisation politicians
Malaysian Muslims
Yang di-Pertua Negeri of Penang
Malaysian people of Minangkabau descent
Grand Commanders of the Order of the Defender of the Realm
Commanders of the Order of Loyalty to the Crown of Malaysia
Officers of the Order of the Defender of the Realm